= Thomas Snowden (footballer) =

English footballer

Personal information
- Full name: Thomas Henry Snowden
- Position: Winger

Senior career*
Years	Team	Apps	(Gls)
1909–1910	Newcastle United	0	(0)
1910–1911	South Shields		
1911–1912	Burnley	14	(0)
- * Club domestic league appearances and goals

Thomas Henry Snowden was an English professional footballer who played as a winger.
